Chryste Dionne Gaines (born September 14, 1970, in Lawton, Oklahoma) is an American Olympic athlete who competed mainly in the sprints.

Education
Gaines is a 1988 graduate of South Oak Cliff High School in Dallas, Texas.

During her senior year, Gaines was named the Gatorade National High School Girls Track & Field Athlete of the Year.

Gaines received a bachelor's degree from Stanford University in 1992 and an MBA from Coles College of Business, Kennesaw State University in 2007.

Track and Field

While at Stanford, Gaines was the 1992 NCAA indoor champion in the 55 meter sprint and the 1992 NCAA outdoor champion at 100 meters. She was the first person to win the conference 100 meter championship three times.

Gaines competed for the United States in Atlanta's 1996 Summer Olympics. In the 4 x 100 metres, she won the gold medal with teammates Gail Devers, Inger Miller and Gwen Torrence.

She returned to Sydney for the 2000 Summer Olympics as the sole survivor of the 4 x 100 meters team. Teamed with Marion Jones Torri Edwards and Nanceen Perry, the Americans earned a bronze medal.

Gaines's best time in the 100 meters was 10.86 seconds (run in 2003).

Gaines successfully competed until 2008.

Doping allegations
In 2003, Gaines was issued a Public Warning and had her results disqualified for the detection of Modafinil.  The same year she was investigated as part of the BALCO scandal and in 2004 she received a two-year doping ban.

Because of a teammate's steroid use, the IOC tried to force the 4x100 relay team to return their bronze medal from the 2000 Olympics. Gaines and her five teammates would successfully appeal.

Honors and awards

Gaines was the 1987-88 Gatorade National Track & Field Athlete of the Year, an award that goes to one high school girl each year from around the country.
 
In 2009, she was named one of 10 “Women Out Front,” a leadership award given by Georgia Tech, where she was an academic advisor.
 	
In 2018, she was named to the 10-person inaugural class of the Dallas Independent School District's Athletic Hall of Fame.

Coaching
Gaines has coached at the high school and college level. As of 2018, Gaines was the track and field and cross country coach at Heritage High School in Frisco, Texas.

See also
 List of doping cases in athletics

References
Notes

Sources

External links
 
 

1970 births
Living people
Sportspeople from Lawton, Oklahoma
Track and field athletes from California
American female sprinters
African-American female track and field athletes
Olympic gold medalists for the United States in track and field
Athletes (track and field) at the 1996 Summer Olympics
Athletes (track and field) at the 2000 Summer Olympics
Pan American Games gold medalists for the United States
Pan American Games medalists in athletics (track and field)
Athletes (track and field) at the 1991 Pan American Games
Athletes (track and field) at the 1995 Pan American Games
World Athletics Championships athletes for the United States
World Athletics Championships medalists
World Athletics Indoor Championships medalists
American sportspeople in doping cases
Doping cases in athletics
Medalists at the 2000 Summer Olympics
Medalists at the 1996 Summer Olympics
Olympic bronze medalists for the United States in track and field
Universiade medalists in athletics (track and field)
Track and field athletes from Oklahoma
Goodwill Games medalists in athletics
Universiade gold medalists for the United States
USA Outdoor Track and Field Championships winners
USA Indoor Track and Field Championships winners
World Athletics Championships winners
Medalists at the 1991 Summer Universiade
Medalists at the 1993 Summer Universiade
Competitors at the 1998 Goodwill Games
Competitors at the 2001 Goodwill Games
Medalists at the 1991 Pan American Games
Medalists at the 1995 Pan American Games
Olympic female sprinters
21st-century African-American sportspeople
21st-century African-American women
20th-century African-American sportspeople
20th-century African-American women
20th-century African-American people